Pine Hill Municipal Airport  was a town-owned public-use airport located one nautical mile (2 km) south of the central business district of Pine Hill, a town in Wilcox County, Alabama, United States.

Facilities and aircraft 
Pine Hill Municipal Airport covers an area of 80 acres (32 ha) at an elevation of 123 feet (37 m) above mean sea level. It has one runway designated 9/27 with an asphalt surface measuring 4,462 by 80 feet (1,360 x 24 m). For the 12-month period ending August 20, 2009, the airport had 300 general aviation aircraft operations, an average of 25 per month. The airport has been permanently closed.

References

External links 
 Aerial image as of 1 February 1992 from USGS The National Map

Airports in Alabama
Transportation buildings and structures in Wilcox County, Alabama